Lowrey organs were originally made in Chicago, Illinois (prior to 2011) and have been played in churches and by professional and home musicians since the 1950s. Lowrey entered the portable keyboard market in the early 1980s with the Wandering Genie, which was succeeded by the Japanese-made Micro Genie line. In January of 2019, Kawai, the owner of the brand, announced it would cease all production of Lowrey Organs.
This list of models is incomplete.

Organs

Portable organs 
Some of Lowrey's portable organs were made in Japan and based on JVC designs.

References 

Keyboard instruments